The Lizzie McGuire Movie is a 2003 American teen comedy film directed by Jim Fall. The film serves as the finale of the Disney Channel television series of the same name, and was the first theatrical film based on a Disney Channel series. The film stars Hilary Duff, Adam Lamberg, Robert Carradine, Hallie Todd and Jake Thomas, and tells the story of Lizzie's graduation trip to Rome. It was released on May 2, 2003, by Buena Vista Pictures, peaking at number two at the domestic box office behind X2. The events of the film take place after the second and final season of Lizzie McGuire.

Plot
Lizzie McGuire prepares for her junior-high graduation with one of her two closest friends, David "Gordo" Gordon. Their other best friend, Miranda Sanchez, has chosen to skip the graduation ceremony in favor of a trip to Mexico City to visit her relatives. During the ceremony, Lizzie trips onstage and accidentally brings the curtain down on her fellow graduates; this causes her to be teased by her younger brother Matt and her former best friend Kate Sanders. After graduation, Lizzie and her classmates embark on a trip to Rome, chaperoned by their future strict high school principal, Angela Ungermeyer. The rest of the class chose a trip to a water park instead. To their dismay, Lizzie and Kate are assigned to the same hotel room.

Their class visits the Trevi Fountain, where Lizzie is approached by an Italian pop star named Paolo Valisari, who mistakes her for his singing partner, Isabella Parigi. Paolo asks Lizzie to meet him at the fountain the next day, and she feigns illness to sneak away. He explains that he and Isabella are booked for the International Music Video Awards, but she left Italy after their partnership breakup. Paolo tells Lizzie that Isabella lip syncs, and begs her to pose as Isabella for the ceremony so that they won't be fined for canceling. Lizzie reluctantly agrees, but soon begins to enjoy the experience and falls for Paolo.

Lizzie continues to fake being ill to prepare for the ceremony, but Kate quickly figures out her secret. To Lizzie's surprise, Kate agrees to help her and the two become friendly again. Meanwhile, Ms. Ungermeyer interrogates the students to learn who has been sneaking out. Gordo takes the blame and is sent back home as punishment. Lizzie is shocked when she learns from Kate that Gordo sacrificed himself to protect her. Back home, Matt browses the Internet and finds Italian gossip sites with pictures of Lizzie as Isabella. When he tells his parents, the family flies to Rome.

At the airport, Gordo meets the real Isabella, who is upset that someone has been impersonating her. She and Gordo realize that Paolo is planning to have a nervous Lizzie unknowingly sing live at the ceremony, as Isabella actually does, creating the impression that Isabella is a fake, which would damage Isabella's career and embarrass Lizzie. Gordo and Isabella rush to the awards to stop him. When the McGuires arrive in Rome, Ms. Ungermeyer learns that Lizzie is missing. Gordo's roommate Ethan Craft reveals that she is performing at the International Music Video Awards, and Lizzie's family and the class also rush to the ceremony. Backstage, Gordo and Isabella find Lizzie preparing for the ceremony and warn her about Paolo's scheme. Lizzie refuses to believe them at first, but Isabella convinces her otherwise. Ms. Ungermeyer gets the class and Lizzie's family into the ceremony by pushing her way through the bouncers.

During the performance, Isabella and Gordo expose Paolo, who is actually the one who lip syncs, by turning on his microphone, revealing his real voice. Embarrassed, Paolo runs off stage, where his manager Sergei tries abandoning him, only to be ambushed outside by paparazzi. Isabella introduces Lizzie to the crowd, and the two of them sing "What Dreams Are Made Of". When Isabella leaves the stage, Lizzie finishes the song solo, displaying a newfound confidence. Later, they all celebrate at the hotel's after party, where Ms. Ungermeyer rescinds Gordo's punishment. Although Lizzie's parents are still proud of her, they tell her she is grounded for the summer. Lizzie and Gordo sneak away from the party to go up to the roof, where they promise to never let things change between them. The two kiss and then rejoin the party before they get into more trouble. As the film ends with fireworks spelling "The End", the animated Lizzie does a parody of Tinker Bell, winking at the audience and closing the series.

Cast
 Hilary Duff as Elizabeth "Lizzie" McGuire and Isabella Parigi
 Haylie Duff as Isabella Parigi (singing voice)
 Adam Lamberg as David "Gordo" Gordon, Lizzie's best friend
 Robert Carradine as Samuel "Sam" McGuire, Lizzie and Matt's father
 Hallie Todd as Joanne "Jo" McGuire, Lizzie and Matt's mother
 Jake Thomas as Matthew "Matt" McGuire, Lizzie's younger brother
 Yani Gellman as Paolo Valisari, an Italian pop star who is Isabella’s former singing partner
 Alex Borstein as Ms. Angela Ungermeyer, Lizzie, Gordo, Kate and Ethan's chaperone
 Clayton Snyder as Ethan Craft, Lizzie and Gordo's classmate
 Ashlie Brillault as Katherine "Kate" Sanders, Lizzie's popular ex-best friend
 Brendan Kelly as Sergei, Paolo's bodyguard
 Carly Schroeder as Melina Bianco, Matt's best friend
 Daniel Escobar as Mr. Escobar, the drama teacher/choir director at Hillridge Junior High School 
 Jody Raicot as Giorgio
 Terra MacLeod as Franca DiMontecatini
 Claude Knowlton as the stage manager

Production
The film, produced by Stan Rogow, was directed by Jim Fall from a screenplay by Susan Estelle Jansen, Ed Decter and John J. Strauss. It was filmed on location in Rome, Italy in the fall of 2002. Most of the series characters reprised their roles except for Lalaine (Miranda Sanchez), who left the series late in the second season to film the Disney Channel original movie You Wish!. Her character was said to be on vacation with her family in Mexico City. Additionally, the characters Claire Miller, Larry Tudgeman, and Lanny Onassis were absent from the film. Director Jim Fall revealed in 2021 that the final song was supposed to have Isabella and Lizzie sing together but he changed it last minute. This is why there are still left-over vocals of Isabella's singing voice, Haylie Duff.

Reception

Critical response
On Rotten Tomatoes the film holds an approval rating of 40% based on 102 reviews, with an average rating of 5.3/10. The site's critics consensus calls the film: "A harmless piece of fluff that ought to satisfy fans of the TV show." On Metacritic the film has a weighted average score of 56 out of 100 based on 28 critics, indicating "mixed or average reviews". Audiences polled by CinemaScore gave the film an average grade of "B" on an A+ to F scale.

Scott Brown of Entertainment Weekly gave the film a B+: "Let's face it: Lizzie McGuire (Hilary Duff) is just too darn polished to be a junior-high underdog, even by the standards of her 'luxe suburban environs'. But that hasn't tarnished her comeback-kid cred among the six-and-ups who faithfully follow her Disney Channel show—and it doesn't make The Lizzie McGuire Movie, a clever, agreeably weightless theatrical outing, any less enjoyable." Roger Ebert gave the film two stars out of four, but praised Borstein's performance, calling her work "the only really delightful element in the movie; everything else is simply slick and professional."

Box office
In its opening weekend the film grossed $17.3 million in 2,825 theaters in the United States and Canada, ranking second behind X2: X-Men United. The Lizzie McGuire Movie grossed $42.7 million domestically and $12.8 million internationally for a worldwide total of $55.5 million.

Awards
 2003 (won): Kids' Choice Award for Movie Breakout Star, Female (Hilary Duff)
 2003 (won): Teen Choice Award for Movie Breakout Star, Female (Hilary Duff)
 2003 (nominated): Teen Choice Awards for Movie Comedy, Movie Comedy Actress (Hilary Duff)
 2004 (nominated): Leo Award for Feature-Length Drama: Best Visual Effects (Gary Gutierrez, Jayne Craig, Bruce Woloshyn, Simon Ager and Wes Sargent)

Soundtrack

Canceled sequel
Following the film, there were plans to continue the Lizzie McGuire series, one of which included a planned sequel film. Nothing came to this due to creative differences with Duff and Disney. In August 2019, it was announced that Lizzie McGuire to be entering production for Disney+, with Duff reprising her role and Minsky returning as showrunner. Lamberg, Thomas, Todd and Carradine will also return to the series in their original roles. The series began production in association with Disney Channel, but entered a hiatus after Minsky's departure and did not resume, being officially canceled in December 2020.

References

External links

  
 
 Review: The Lizzie McGuire Movie - Disney Family
 Article about "Why Not" on TotalGirl! Australia
 

2003 films
2000s adventure comedy films
2000s musical comedy films
2003 romantic comedy films
2000s romantic musical films
2000s teen comedy films
2000s teen romance films
American adventure comedy films
American films with live action and animation
American musical comedy films
American romantic comedy films
American romantic musical films
American teen comedy films
American teen musical films
American teen romance films
Films about lookalikes
Films about singers
Films based on television series
Films directed by Jim Fall
Films scored by Cliff Eidelman
Films set in Los Angeles
Films set in Rome
Films shot in Los Angeles
Films shot in Rome
Films shot in Vancouver
2000s Italian-language films
Movie
Middle school films
Teen adventure films
Walt Disney Pictures films
2000s English-language films
2000s American films
American television series finales